Dark Side of the Man is the first studio album by Australian musician Ross Wilson, released in 1989. Two singles were released from the album - Bed Of Nails and the title track Dark Side of the Man. Dark Side Of The Man peaked at number 26 on the Kent Music Report. The song Dark Side of the Man peaked at number 57 on the Kent Music Report.

Track listing

Personnel 
 Acoustic guitar – Kerryn Tolhurst
 Alto saxophone – Ian Chaplin (tracks: 6 to 8)
 Alto saxophone solo – Ian Wallace (tracks: 7)
 Backing vocals – Eris O'Brien (tracks: 9, 11), James Gillard (tracks: 1), Linda Bull (tracks: 5),  Mark Williams (4) (tracks: 3, 4), Vika Bull (tracks: 5), Wendy Matthews (tracks: 3, 4)
 Backing vocals (chanting) – Anthony Joiner (tracks: 3), Darren Jenkins (tracks: 3)
 Bass – Barry Johnson (tracks: 2, 3, 9), Ian Belton (tracks: 4, 5, 11), Lloyd Swanton (tracks: 6 to 8)
 Bass, backing vocals – Daryl Johnson
 Double bass – Tony Garnier (tracks: 10)
 Drums – Andrew Travers (tracks: 11), Gary Young (tracks: 4),  Peter Luscombe (tracks: 5), Tony Floyd (tracks: 6 to 8)
 Drums, backing vocals – Ricky Fataar (tracks: 1 to 3, 9)
 Engineer – Angus Davidson (tracks: 6 to 8), Paul Special (tracks: 1 to 3, 9, 10)
 Fiddle – Wayne Goodwin (tracks: 5)
 Guitar – Doug De Vries (tracks: 6 to 8), Mark Moffatt (tracks: 3 to 5, 11), Mark Punch (tracks: 4, 5)
 Keyboards – Craig Hooper (tracks: 4), Richard Tee (tracks: 10)
 Keyboards, backing vocals, percussion – Jay Askew (tracks: 10)
 Keyboards, clavinet – Bernie Worrell (tracks: 1 to 3, 9)
 Lead guitar, electric guitar – Shane Fontayne (tracks: 1, 2, 9)
 Lead guitar, rhythm guitar – Chris Spedding (tracks: 3)
 Mandolin – Wayne Goodwin (tracks: 11)
 Percussion – Ray Pereira (2) (tracks: 6 to 8)
 Piano, strings, vibes – Paul Grabowsky (tracks: 6 to 8)
 Rhythm guitar – Mike Hampton (tracks: 1)
 Shaker – Alex Pitou (tracks: 4, 5)
 Tenor saxophone solo – Paul Williamson (tracks: 6 to 8)
 Trombone – Russell Smith (tracks: 7, 8)
 Trumpet – Vince Jones (tracks: 8)
 Vocals – Russell Smith (4) (tracks: 6), Shelley Scown (tracks: 6, 7)
 Vocals, guitar, harmonica – Ross Wilson

Production
Producer – Paul Grabowsky (tracks: 6 to 8), Ricky Fataar (tracks: 1 to 3, 9, 10)
Producer, engineer – Mark Moffatt (tracks: 4, 5, 11)
Mixed by Mark Opitz
Mixed by (assistant) – Andrew Scott

Charts

References 

1989 debut albums
Mushroom Records albums
Warner Music Group albums
Ross Wilson (musician) albums